Denys Vadymovych Shostak (born 24 January 2003) is a Ukrainian professional footballer who plays as a central midfielder for  Estoril Praia, on loan from Shakhtar Donetsk.

Career
Mykytyshyn is a product of Vorskla Poltava and Shakhtar Donetsk youth sportive school systems. He made his debut for Mariupol in the Ukrainian Premier League in the away match against Dnipro-1 on 7 August 2021 which ended with a loss.

References

External links
 
 

2003 births
Living people
Sportspeople from Poltava
Ukrainian footballers
Ukraine youth international footballers
Association football midfielders
FC Shakhtar Donetsk players
FC Mariupol players
G.D. Estoril Praia players
Ukrainian Premier League players
Ukrainian expatriate footballers
Expatriate footballers in Portugal
Ukrainian expatriate sportspeople in Portugal